Otovice refers to the following places in the Czech Republic:

 Otovice (Karlovy Vary District)
 Otovice (Náchod District)